Mwaba is a surname of Zambian origin that may refer to:
Chanda Mwaba (born 1988), Zambian football midfielder  
David Mwaba, Tanzanian boxer
Maybin Mwaba (born 1987), retired Zambian football midfielder
Moses Mwaba, Zambian boxer
N'gandwe Mwaba (born 1982), Zambian artist

Zambian surnames
Bemba-language surnames